Rakitna may refer to:

 Rakitna, Brezovica, a village in Municipality of Brezovica, Slovenia
 Rakitna, Blagoevgrad Province, a village in Blagoevgrad Province, Bulgaria